The Big West Conference Women's Basketball Coach of the Year is an annual college basketball award given to head coaches in the Big West Conference. 

The award was first given at the end of the 1983–84 season to husband and wife co-coaches Sheila Strike and Jim Bolla of UNLV. The program with the most awards is UC Santa Barbara with 8, with Mark French's conference-leading 7 awards and Lindsay Gottlieb garnering the award in 2009. Jennifer Gross is the only head coach to win five consecutive coach of the year honors, her most recent being after the 2020–21 season.

Winners

Winners by school

Notes

References 

NCAA Division I women's basketball conference coaches of the year
Big West Conference women's basketball
Awards established in 1983